James David Meyer (born June 9, 1963) is a former offensive tackle in the National Football League. Meyer played for the Green Bay Packers during the 1987 NFL season. He had previously been drafted in the seventh round of the 1986 NFL Draft by the Cleveland Browns.

References

Green Bay Packers players
American football offensive tackles
Illinois State Redbirds football players
1963 births
Living people